The 1991 Toyota Atlantic Championship season was contested over 13 rounds. There were also two non-championship events at Race City Speedway in Calgary. The SCCA Toyota Atlantic Championship Drivers' Champion was Jovy Marcelo.

Races

Final driver standings (Top 12)

See also
1991 IndyCar season
1991 Indy Lights season

External links
ChampCarStats.com

Atlantic Championship 1991
Atlantic Championship seasons